The Party of Italian Communists (PdCI) was a communist party in Italy established in October 1998 by splinters from the Communist Refoundation Party (PRC). The split was led by Armando Cossutta, founder and early leader of the PRC, who opposed Fausto Bertinotti's leaderhip and, especially, his decision to withdraw support from Romano Prodi's first cabinet. In December 2014, the party was transformed into Communist Party of Italy (PCd'I), which would later evolve into the re-edition of the Italian Communist Party (PCI).

History

Foundation and early years 
In October 1998, the PRC was divided between those who wanted to stop supporting Romano Prodi's first government, led by PRC secretary Fausto Bertinotti; and those who wanted to continue the alliance, led by PRC president Cossutta. The central committee endorsed Bertinotti's line, but Cossutta and his followers decided to support Prodi nonetheless. The votes of cossuttiani were not enough and the government lost a confidence vote in Parliament. The dissidents, who controlled the majority of deputies and senators, split and formed a rival communist outfit, the PdCI, which immediately joined the first cabinet led by Massimo D'Alema, leader of the Democrats of the Left and first post-communist to hold the job of Prime Minister of Italy. Under D'Alema, PdCI's Oliviero Diliberto served as Minister of Justice.

Despite the split of most of PRC's parliamentary representation, the PRC remained more popular than the PdCI with voters, both in the 1999 European Parliament election (4.3% to 2.0%) and the 2001 general election (5.0% to 1.7%).

Leadership of Diliberto 
Diliberto, who had been elected secretary in 2000, led the PdCI to continue its participation in the centre-left coalition (known at the time as The Olive Tree) at the 2001 general election, which registered a victory by Silvio Berlusconi's centre-right House of Freedoms coalition. The PdCI obtained 1.7% of the vote and a handful of deputies and senators.

In the 2006 general election, the party was a member of the winning The Union coalition and won 2.4% of the vote and 16 deputies while the Together with the Union electoral list consisting of the PdCI, the Federation of the Greens and United Consumers won 11 senators. Subsequently, the PdCI entered Prodi's second government, which would last until January 2008.

In the meantime, Diliberto had become the undisputed leader of the party and since 2005 clashes between him and Cossutta became frequent. In 2006, the latter resigned from president and was replaced by Antonino Cuffaro. In 2007, Cossutta left the party altogether.

For the 2008 general election, the PdCI formed a joint list named Rainbow Left (SA) along with the PRC, the Greens and Democratic Left under Bertinotti's leadership. SA obtained a mere 3.1% (compared to 10.2% won by the constituent parties individually two years before) and no seats. In 2008, Diliberto was re-elected secretary and proposed to the PRC a re-unification of the two parties through a "communist constituent assembly".

Out of Parliament 
In the run-up of the 2009 European Parliament election, the PdCI formed along with the PRC and minor groups the Anticapitalist and Communist List. The list got 3.4% of the vote and no MEPs. In April 2009, the list was transformed into the Federation of the Left, which would be disbanded by the end of 2012 and officially dissolved in 2015. In the 2013 general election, the PdCI ran within Civil Revolution along with the PRC, the Greens, Italy of Values and minor groups, gaining 2.2% of the vote and no seats. The PdCI did not contest the 2014 European Parliament election, withdrawing its early support for The Other Europe electoral list.

Before and after the 2009 European election, the PdCI lost its right- and left-wings, respectively. In February, Unite the Left, led by Katia Bellillo (a former minister) and Umberto Guidoni (an incumbent MEP), left the party in order to participate in the election with the Left and Freedom list and would eventually merge into Left Ecology Freedom. In June, Marco Rizzo (the other incumbent MEP and former Diliberto's number two) was expelled and would later form the hard-line Communist Party.

In July 2013, Diliberto stepped down from secretary after thirteen years and was replaced by Cesare Procaccini, a 65-year-old former metalworker from Marche.

Communist Party of Italy 

In December 2014, the PdCI was transformed into Communist Party of Italy, taking the name of the late Communist Party of Italy.

Election results

Italian Parliament

European Parliament

Symbols

Leadership 
 Secretary: Armando Cossutta (1998–2000), Oliviero Diliberto (2000–2013), Cesare Procaccini (2013–2014)
 Coordinator: Marco Rizzo (1998–2009), Orazio Licandro (2009–2013), Alessandro Pignatiello (2013–2014)
 President: Armando Cossutta (2000–2006), Antonino Cuffaro (2007–2013), Manuela Palermi (2013–2014)
 Honorary President: Antonino Cuffaro (2013–2014)
 Party Leader in the Chamber of Deputies: Oliviero Diliberto (1998), Tullio Grimaldi (1998–2001), Marco Rizzo (2001–2004), Pino Sgobio (2004–2008)
 Party Leader in the Senate: Luigi Marino (1998–2006), Manuela Palermi (leader of the PdCI-Green's group, 2006–2008)
 Party Leader in the European Parliament: Lucio Manisco (1998–2004), Marco Rizzo (2004–2009)

References

External links

Official website

1998 establishments in Italy
2014 disestablishments in Italy
Defunct communist parties in Italy
Defunct political parties in Italy
Party of the European Left former member parties
Political parties disestablished in 2014
Political parties established in 1998
International Meeting of Communist and Workers Parties